Michael Darling may refer to:

 Michael Darling (Peter Pan), youngest of the three children in the Darling family
 Michael Darling (curator) (born 1968), curator at the Museum of Contemporary Art, Chicago
 Michael Darling (field hockey) (born 1988), Ireland field hockey international